Ermidelio Urrutia Quiroga (born August 25, 1963) is a Cuban baseball player and Olympic gold medalist.

Urrutia is a one time Gold medalist for baseball, winning at the 1992 Summer Olympics.

His son, Henry Urrutia, also played baseball in Cuba, until he defected.

References

External links
 
 

1963 births
Living people
Leñadores de Las Tunas players
Olympic baseball players of Cuba
Olympic gold medalists for Cuba
Olympic medalists in baseball
Medalists at the 1992 Summer Olympics
Baseball players at the 1992 Summer Olympics
Pan American Games gold medalists for Cuba
Baseball players at the 1991 Pan American Games
Baseball players at the 1995 Pan American Games
Pan American Games medalists in baseball
Central American and Caribbean Games gold medalists for Cuba
Competitors at the 1990 Central American and Caribbean Games
Competitors at the 1993 Central American and Caribbean Games
Goodwill Games medalists in baseball
Central American and Caribbean Games medalists in baseball
Competitors at the 1990 Goodwill Games
Medalists at the 1991 Pan American Games
Medalists at the 1995 Pan American Games